Ziabar Rural District is a rural district (dehestan) in the Central District of Sowme'eh Sara County, Gilan Province, Iran. At the 2006 census, its population was 11,387, in 3,234 families. The rural district has 32 villages.

References 

Rural Districts of Gilan Province
Sowme'eh Sara County